Blind Love is a 1912 American short silent drama film directed by D. W. Griffith and starring Blanche Sweet.

Plot
A young woman tired of her boring life decided to leave her husband for another man who she find more exciting. Later, with a child and in disgrace she realizes that she made a huge mistake and tries to go back to her husband.

Cast
 Blanche Sweet as The Young Woman
 Harry Hyde as The Young Woman's Husband
 Edward Dillon as The Young Man
 Hector Sarno as A Gypsy (as Hector V. Sarno)
 W. Chrystie Miller as The Young Man's Father
 Kate Toncray as The Minister's Wife
 William J. Butler as The Landlord
 Joseph McDermott as The Doctor
 Alfred Paget as A Policeman
 Kathleen Butler as At the Social
 John T. Dillon as At the Social
 Frank Evans as On the Road
 Walter P. Lewis as At the Social
 W. C. Robinson as At the Social
 Charles West

See also
 List of American films of 1912
 D. W. Griffith filmography
 Blanche Sweet filmography

References

External links

1912 films
American silent short films
American black-and-white films
1912 drama films
1912 short films
Films directed by D. W. Griffith
Silent American drama films
1910s American films